Camarin D Elementary School is a public elementary school located in Caloocan, Philippines.

References

Public schools in the Philippines
Schools in Caloocan